The Policía Nacional Bolivariana (PNB) is Venezuela's national police force, created in 2009. Law enforcement in Venezuela has historically been highly fragmented, and the creation of a national police force was originally unpopular among the public and organizations. The creation of a National Police was one of the recommendations of a 2006 National Commission on Police Reform (CONAREPOL). At the time that the force was set up, the wage rate for officers in the new force was three times higher than that in existing forces.

As of July 2010, the PNB had around 2,400 officers, with a further 1,400 in training. Now it has grown into an estimated 20,000-strong national police force.

Background
In 2001, the Venezuelan National Assembly gave the government one year to create a national police force. President Hugo Chávez then attempted to create a centralized national police force, announcing his plans in August 2002. However, the Venezuelan public, academics, NGOs and municipal governments rejected the idea with Alfredo Peña stating that the police would possibly be used to repress protesters, resulting with the Venezuelan government canceling the creation of a national police force.

In 2006 a National Commission on Police Reform (CONAREPOL, from the Spanish name) conducted studies aimed at reforming the police, in consultation with police and local communities. It found that 
"Careful study of the different police agencies makes it evident that many do not have adequate infrastructure, and they are lacking in basic services or the spaces that are necessary for police activities (e.g., holding cells). In other cases, they do not even have their own building. Higher level technological resources (phones, fax, internet connection, computers, software) are relatively rare or, if present, are found only at central headquarters. Lack of, or deficiencies in, infrastructure are most marked for the municipal police.… [T]he majority of [all] police agencies are unable to assign a firearm to each officer on duty; neither are there sufficient handcuffs or bullet-proof vests. Some agencies have only one firearm for the whole force."

In general, the Commission found, "bureaucracy is weakly developed: three-quarters of state and municipal forces do not have a manual for procedures and two-thirds lack an organizational manual".

In November 2008 a Commission for the Police System (Comsipol) was created to implement CONAREPOL's recommendations. These included the creation of a National Police, which was done in 2009. Other recommendations were that the police should be specifically trained in human rights, and have a greater emphasis on crime prevention. The Experimental Security University was set up to provide such training with branches in various Venezuelan cities.

On 7 December 2009, the Bolivarian National Police was officially raised with the full enactment of the Police Service Organic Law of 2009 and the Police Service Statutes Law, published on the Official Gazette on the same day. These laws formally marked the founding of what is now South America's youngest national police force, which took place formally on December 20 the same year.

Special Actions Force 
The Special Actions Force of the Bolivarian National Police (FAES) was created by President Nicolás Maduro to "combat crime and terrorism" in 2017. It has around 1,300 officers and includes the Unidad de Operaciones Tácticas Especiales (UOTE) a police tactical unit. It was accused by PROVEA, a Venezuelan human rights group, of having killed more than 100 people in low-income neighborhoods in the six months leading up to January 2019 during the protests in Venezuela. On 5 July 2019 the UN High Commissioner for Human Rights, Michelle Bachelet, released a report presenting evidence of the murdering of at least 6,800 Venezuelans from January 2018 to May 2019 by various security forces including the FAES. The report included documentation of instances of torture, including waterboarding and electric shocks. The regime deemed it as "biased". The PNB originally formed a police tactical unit in 2011.

Functions 
While Article 34 of the Police Organic Law states the similarities of the National Police with the state, municipal, city and township police forces and the Venezuelan National Guard, Article 39 of the said law states the following services to be rendered only by personnel of the National Police:
 Customs policing, penal establishment protection, environmental, maritime and migration protection, transport police services and border security
 Protection of state dignitaries and the diplomatic corps
 Partnerships with international police agencies and compliance with international laws ratified by the Venezuelan government
 Raising tactical groups with their respective regulations 
 Full compliance with judicial order, laws and regulations passed by the National Assembly

Organization 
The National Police is headed by, as of 2016, the Director General of the National Police, Police Chief Commissioner MGEN Juan Francisco Romero Figueroa.

It is organized into:
 National Command Directoriate of the National Police
 Deputy Directorate
 Office of the National Police Secretariat General 
 National Police Offices for:
 Police Complaints and Actions 
 Legal Services
 Human Resources
 Information Technology
 Communications and Public Relations
 Police Planning and Systems
 Administration
 Special Action Force
 Victim attention and police operations
 National Police Directorates
 Operations and Special Tactics
 Intelligence
 Land and Transportation Investigation and Security
 Aviation 
 Migration
 Prisons Police
 National Police Regional Commands serving all 23 states of Venezuela through the State, Municipal and Township/City Police Forces and in coastal areas by the Maritime Command
 Western
 Andes
 Central
 Plains
 Guayana
 Eastern and Insular
 Capital (Greater Caracas)

Ranks

See also 
 Law enforcement in Venezuela
 Murder of Kluivert Roa

References

Sources
 Birkbeck, Christopher (2009), "Venezuela: the shifting organizational framework for the police", Police Practice and Research, Volume 10, Issue 4 August 2009, pages 295–304

External links
 www.policianacional.gob.ve

Law enforcement agencies of Venezuela
2009 establishments in Venezuela